The Harris Bridge, located near Wren, Oregon, is a covered bridge listed on the National Register of Historic Places.

Harris Bridge was named for George Harris, an early settler.

See also
 List of bridges on the National Register of Historic Places in Oregon
 National Register of Historic Places listings in Benton County, Oregon

References

External links
 
 Aerial Video of Harris Covered Bridge, Benton County, Oregon

1936 establishments in Oregon
Bridges completed in 1936
Covered bridges on the National Register of Historic Places in Oregon
National Register of Historic Places in Benton County, Oregon
Road bridges on the National Register of Historic Places in Oregon
Wooden bridges in Oregon
Howe truss bridges in the United States